Lawrence B. Marcus (July 19, 1917 – August 28, 2001) was an American screenwriter. He was nominated for an Academy Award in the category Best Adapted Screenplay for the film The Stunt Man. Marcus died in August 2001 of Parkinson's disease at the Motion Picture & Television Fund cottages in Woodland Hills, California, at the age of 84.

Selected filmography 
 Backfire (1950)
 Dark City (1950)
 Cause for Alarm! (1951; based on his radio work)
 Paula (1952)
 The Bigamist (1953)
 The Unguarded Moment (1956)
 Witness for the Prosecution (1957)
 Diamond Safari (1958)
 Voice in the Mirror (1958)
 Brainstorm (1965)
 A Covenant with Death (1967)
 Petulia (1968)
 Justine (1969)
 Going Home (1971)
 Alex & the Gypsy (1976)
 The Stunt Man (1980; co-nominated with Richard Rush)

References

External links 

1917 births
2001 deaths
People from Beaver, Utah
Deaths from Parkinson's disease
New York University alumni
Screenwriters from Utah
American radio writers
American male screenwriters
American television writers
American male television writers
20th-century American screenwriters